Frutos is the Spanish word for "fruits". It may refer to:
Given name
Frutos, a Castilian hermit and saint
Frutos Baeza, a Spanish poet
Frutos Feo, a Spanish sprinter
Other
Doctor Juan Manuel Frutos, a Paraguayan town in Caaguazú Department
Don Frutos Gómez, a 1961 Argentine film directed by Rubén W. Cavallotti 
Frutos, a surname

See also

Fruto (disambiguation)
Fructus (disambiguation)